Gandhidham, initially known as Sardarganj, is the largest and most populous city in Kutch District, Gujarat, India. It was created in the early 1950s for the resettlement of Sindhi Hindu refugees from Sindh (now in Pakistan) in the aftermath of the partition of India. It was named after Mahatma Gandhi, the father of the Indian nation. An economic capital of Kutch and a growing area for families and retirees, it is Gujarat's 8th most populous city. It is a popular destination for conventions, business, and meetings.

History

Soon after the Partition of India in 1947, a large group of Sindhi Hindus refugees from Sindh of Pakistan migrated to India. The Maharaja of Kutch His Highness Maharao Shri Vijayrajji Khengarji Jadeja, donated  of land to Bhai Pratap, who founded the Sindhu Resettlement Corporation Ltd (SRC) to rehabilitate Sindhi Hindus that migrated from Sindh in Pakistan.

The Sindhu Resettlement Corporation Ltd was formed with Acharaya Kriplani as chairman and Bhai Pratap Dialdas as managing director. The main objective of the corporation was to assist in the rehousing of displaced persons by the construction of a new township. The original plan was prepared by a team of planners headed by Dr. O. H. Koenigsberger, director of the division of housing in the Government of India. Later, the plan was revised by Adams Howard and Greeley Company in 1952. The foundation stone of the town was laid with the blessings of Gandhi in 1947. Hence, the town was named Gandhidham. To clean the desert where it was built, Bhai Pratap gave an incentive of 25 paise to kill scorpions and 50 paise to kill snakes. The original plan envisaged 400,000 as of the ultimate population of the town, expecting half of it to be reached in the mid-seventies. A revised plan envisaged three stages of town development with the mid-stage lasting longer with a population of around 150,000.

Geography and climate
Gandhidham is located at latitude 23.08° N longitude 70.13° E. The main city is constructed in accordance with the principles of
Vastu-Shastra (Hindu belief of construction), i.e., the main city has its face directed to the East.

Almost all rainfall occurs during the monsoon season from June to September — outside this period, Gandhidham averages just  of rain in eight months. Gandhidhamʼs amount of rainfall, although not especially low on paper, is amongst the most erratic anywhere in the world with a coefficient of variation of around sixty percent  – among the few comparably variable climates in the world being the Line Islands of Kiribati, the Pilbara coast of Western Australia, the sertão of Northeastern Brazil, and the Cape Verde islands.

During the “cool” season from October to March, temperatures range from very warm to hot during the afternoon and are cool to pleasant in the mornings. Whilst during the hot season, afternoon temperatures become sweltering and extremely unpleasant, especially when, with the approach of the monsoon, humidity increases.

Governance
The city is represented by a constituency in the Gujarat Vidhan Sabha.  It forms part of the Kachchh Lok Sabha constituency.

2001 Earthquake Calamity

The Gujarat earthquake of 2001 majorly affected the city of Gandhidham along with many nearby towns like Bhuj, Anjar, Bhachau and more. The shock, which measured 7.7 on the moment magnitude scale and had a maximum Mercalli intensity of XI (Extreme), killed 13,805–20,023, left roughly 166,800 injured, and many were left homeless including Gandhidham. The death toll in the Kutch region was 12,300. Bhuj, which was situated only 50  km away from the Gandhidham, was devastated. Considerable damage also occurred in City Gandhdidham and Bhachau and Anjar with hundreds of villages flattened in Taluka of Anjar, Bhuj and Bhachau.

Land of Adipur and Gandhidham
Gandhidham was the dream of Pratap Dialdas. Bhai Pratap Dialdas requested great Leaders of India for the procurement of land in the Kachchh region. They requested Maharao Vijayraj Ji of Kachchh for granting of land for re-settlement of Sindhi community people migrated from Sindh. Maharao, without any delay, granted 15000 acres of land for the purpose. Bhai Pratap said this is too big land and cannot be developed by SRC Ltd, therefore, he desired to keep with him only 2,600 acres, and the rest of the land was given to KPT and GDA for management. Today Adipur and Gandhidham townships are the townships of pride in the District of Kachchh only with the grace of Rajput Kshatriya ancestors – Provided by Ram Amarnani.

Distance between twin-townships of Adipur & Gandhidham is 6  km still not developed fully and 0  km if full land constructed. The airport road dividing wards 5 & 7 divides these townships, whereas Municipality is one, known as Gandhidham Municipality. These towns are divided in two parts wherein land is recognized as Wards & Sectors.
Townships have six wards each 1to6 in Adipur and 7to12 in Gandhidham. These wards consist of commercial, industrial and residential plots of land.
The land which is owned and managed by SRC (The Sindhu Resettlement Corporation Ltd) is known as 'Wards' and
The land which is owned and managed by KPT (Kandla Port Trust) is known as 'Sectors'. There are 13 such sectors in Gandhidham.
Apart from this, there is vast land managed by GDA (Gandhidham Development Authority) which is known as "NU".
For the construction of any permanent structure in these townships, the permission of GDA is a must.

Education
Schools in the area include

CBSE SCHOOLS 
Academic Heights Public School 
Delhi Public High School (D.P.S)
Kakubhai Parikh School (K.P.S)
Amarchand Singhvi School
Podar International School
Savvy International School
The Fusion School
St. Thomas School 
Atmiya Vidyapeeth School
D.A.V. Public School
Welspun Vidya Mandir(W. V. M)
Mount Litera Zee School
Kendriya Vidyalaya at IFFCO colony
Kendriya Vidyalaya at Railway colony
Aum Vidiya Mandir at IFFCO colony

STATE BOARD ENGLISH MEDIUM SCHOOLS

Mount Carmel High School
Saint Xaviers at Adipur
Modern School
P.N. Amersey High School
St. Marys School at Kandla
Gurunanak Public School, Adipur
Shree swaminarayan vidyalaya
Ananda Marga High School in DC-2, Rambaug road (English Medium)
Ananda Marga Primary school in Sector-7
Gurunanak School for Excellence
Sadhu Vaswani International School
Excelsior Model School, Adipur
Kairali English School
Cambridge School, Gandhidham
Shri Krishana Public School.

GUJARATI MEDIUM SCHOOLS

Sardar Vallabh bhai Patel High School
Saint Xaviers at Adipur
RP Patel High School
Shri Saraswati Vidhyalaya
Shri Sahyog Saraswati Vidhya Mandir
Ambe Bhavnath High School
M.P. Patel Kanya Vidyalaya

PRE-PRIMARY SCHOOLS

Bachpan Pre-School
Podar Jumbo Kids
Twinkle Star School in 2B, plot No.48 (English Medium)
Small Wonder School
Einstein School
Kangaroo Kids School
Makoons Pre School
Wonderland Kids School

Hindi Medium Schools are

 Dr. C. G. High School
Maitri School at Adipur
Maitri Kanya Mahavidyala at Adipur
 Adarsh Maha Vidhyalaya at Gandhidham are the first and oldest schools situated in the heart of the city.

For professional courses like Chartered Accountancy and Cost & Management Accountancy the national professional accounting body of India like Institute of Chartered Accountants of India and Institute of Cost Accountants of India have opened an examination centre at Adipur.

College and graduation
Colleges for graduation and higher studies are Tolani College of Science & Arts, Tolani Commerce College, Pharmacy college and Diploma in Engineering, Management Institute situated nearby in Adipur.  DNV International Educational College is situated in Bharatnagar; the courses provided are BCA and BBA

Transport

Gandhidham is connected by road and rail to the rest of India. Transport Nagar, on the outskirts of Gandhidham, is the hub of all major transport activity. There are trains to, Ahmedabad, Allahabad, Varanasi, Kanpur, Agra, Lucknow, Faizabad, Patna,
Jodhpur, Ajmer, Alwar, Abu Road, Jaipur, Mumbai, Vadodara, Surat, Yesvantpur, Kalyan, Bhiwandi, Pune, Kolkata, Ahmedabad, Indore, Bangalore, Thiruvananthapuram, Kochi, Kollam, Kota, Delhi, Durg, Guwahati, Puri, Chengannur, Jalgaon, Bhusaval, Raipur, Vizag, Nagercoil, Vijayawada, Warangal, Rajahmundry and several other cities. Many private companies operate bus services to major cities in Gujarat like Ahmedabad and Rajkot. India's largest port, Kandla is around 11 km from the city. It also has connectivity to Kandla Airport near village Galpadar. From August 2016 Airconnect has started its daily services for Ahmedabad and Surat (Kandla-Ahmedabad-Surat at 17:40 & Surat-Ahmedabad-Kandla at 07:45). Spicejet has announced one flight from Mumbai to Kandla Airport (Gandhidham) Departing at 13:05 and arriving at 14:30; and return to Mumbai with departure at 15:10, arriving at 16:50 from 11th July 2017 onwards.

Trains

Airport
Kandla airport is a small airport on the outskirt of Gandhidham near Galpadar town, which is not a regular airport.
Daily one jet flight to-n-fro service is available from Kandla to Mumbai. SpiceJet has announced one more flight for Mumbai from 11 July 2017 onward. Truejet has stated flight for Ahmedabad.

See also
Kandla
Adipur
Galpadar

References

Further reading
Kripalani, J. B. 1951. Gandhidham. Bombay: [Mangharam N. Thadani for the Sindhu Resettlement Corp.]
Adams, Howard & Greely. 1952. Report on a revised plan for the town and region of Gandhidham, Anjar Taluka, Kutch India, prepared for the Government of India Ministry of Transport, and the United States Department of State. [Boston: Adams, Howard & Greely].

External links
Kandla Special Economic Zone
Deendayal Port Authority
Arya Samaj, Gandhidham
Tolani Foundation
KutchForever.com – The First Internet Gateway of Kutch
Sindhu Resettlement Corporation Limited (SRC Limited), Adipur
Lions Club of Gandhidham  Official website of Lions club of Gandhidham, India
www.sindhology.org

 
Cities and towns in Kutch district